The Springfield Model 1869 was one of several model "trapdoor Springfields", which used the trapdoor breechblock design developed by Erskine S. Allin.

History and Design
Originally, the trapdoor Springfields were created to convert Model 1863 Springfield rifled muskets to breech-loading rifles at a relatively low cost.

The Model 1869 Cadet Rifle was a shortened version of the Springfield Model 1868. It had a 29.5 inch barrel, compared to the 32.5 inch barrel of the Model 1868, and had an overall length of 48.8 inches. The Model 1869 was produced using Model 1868 receivers and breech blocks, but used a stock that was manufactured specifically for the Model 1869. The Model 1869 had a narrower buttplate and the stock around the barrel was thinner than on the Model 1868.

This model has its own sequence of serial numbers, running from 1 to approx. 3422.

See also
 Springfield rifle

References
"The .45-70 Springfield, Book II, 1865-1893, Albert Frasca, PhD, Frasca Publishing
"The .58 and .50 Caliber Rifles and Carbines of The Springfield Armory, 1865-1872", Richard A. Hosmer, North Cape Publications 2006

Rifles of the United States
Early rifles
Hinged breechblock rifles
Springfield firearms
Guns of the American West